Havelock is a civil parish in Kings County, New Brunswick, Canada.

For governance purposes it forms the local service district of the parish of Havelock, which further includes the western part of the service area of Havelock Inside. The local service district is a member of Regional Service Commission 8 (RSC8).

Origin of name
The parish was named in honour of Henry Havelock, commander of British forces at the Siege of Lucknow in 1857, who died shortly after the siege was lifted.

History
Havelock was erected in 1859 from the eastern polling district of Studholm Parish.

In 1871 part of Havelock along Windgap Brook was returned to Studholm.

Boundaries
Havelock Parish is bounded:

 on the northwest by the Queens County line;
 on the east by the Westmorland County line;
 on the southeast by a line running north 66º east from the northeastern corner of a grant to Jacob Smith, about 975 metres north of the junction of Plumweseep Road and Back Road;
 on the west by a line beginning on the Cardwell Parish line near the Old Mine Road west of Dunsinane, then running northwesterly along the prolongation of the southwestern line of a grant to James Caruth, which is on the southern bank of Windgap Brook and on the eastern side of Jordan Mountain Road, until it strikes Windgap Brook, then upstream to the prolongation of Miller Road, then north-northwesterly along the prolongation, the length of Miller Road, and the northerly prolongation of Miller Road until it strikes the Queens County line.

Communities
Communities at least partly within the parish. italics indicate a name no longer in official use

 Anagance Ridge
 Buckley Settlement
 Canaan Road
  Cornhill
 Cornhill East
 Cosman Settlement
 Creek Road
 Dubee Settlement
  Havelock
 Knightville
 Lower Ridge
 Mannhurst
 Perry Settlement
 Salem
 Samp Hill
 Springhill
 Thornbrook
 Whites Mountain

Bodies of water
Bodies of water at least partly within the parish.
  Canaan River
 Millstream River
 Smiths Creek
 Square Meadow Creek

Other notable places
Parks, historic sites, and other noteworthy places at least partly within the parish.
 Havelock Airport

Demographics

Population
Population trend

Language
Mother tongue  (2016)

Access Routes
Highways and numbered routes that run through the parish, including external routes that start or finish at the parish limits:

Highways

Principal Routes

Secondary Routes:

External Routes:
None

See also
List of parishes in New Brunswick

Notes

References

Parishes of Kings County, New Brunswick
Local service districts of Kings County, New Brunswick